Latin Lover is a joint telenovela production between Venevisión (Venezuela), Iguana Producciones (Peru), and Playboy Entertainment Group (United States). It centers around the production of a fictional telenovela (a novela-within-the-novela, also translated as "Latin Lover"), and follows the lives (mainly the sex lives) of the actors and production staff involved in the show, as well as other tangential characters. The show features a large main cast of at least 23 credited performers.

Each episode features a number of softcore pornographic and simulated sexy scenes, commonly including full frontal and rear nudity, though rarely showing either male or female genitalia.

As of July 6, 2008, Latin Lover is broadcast in Canada by Telelatino, dubbed into English. A new series called Latin Lover 2: Beauty & Ambition (Bellas y ambiciosas) premiered on Telelatino Network in Spring 2009.

Premise
The plot generally revolves around the character Rafael Carballo, the director of the "Latin Lover" novela. Rafael is portrayed as an attractive man whom women often find difficult to resist. He is often equally incapable of declining the sexual advances of the scheming, seductive women involved in the novela and the production company behind it. This often gets him into trouble; particularly with his longtime girlfriend Viviana - daughter of Mariana and Samuel Ventura Moreira. Samuel is the powerful owner of Canal Internacional, which produces the novela. Samuel also has an affair with Bárbara - a seductress who is secretly after Samuel's position, and devises many plots to further that goal.

A major story arc early in the series is Rafael's search for the actress that will star in the novela. Several actresses fight over the role, including Renata and Valeria. However, an unexpected candidate emerges in Claudia Fuentes, a waitress whose aunt prepares lunch at the novela's studio. Claudia does not even want the job; she is in love with Omar, a mechanic, but finds that he is too controlling for her.

After a video of Rafael sleeping with Renata is leaked to the press, Viviana leaves him, and he is forced to resign from the novela. Viviana decides to begin working for the station herself, in preparation for taking over from her father. Bárbara is also reinstated at Canal, and after offering the job to Silvana, who threatens to organize a strike if Rafael isn't reinstated, she decides to direct the novela herself. However, after Bárbara is caught sleeping with an actor on the set, Viviana puts her personal problems aside and suggests her father rehire Rafael.

Meanwhile, Samuel ends his affair with Bárbara after he meets Débora Bacigallupo - a young actress whose controlling mother forces her to seduce Samuel in order to gain a role in the novela. Samuel falls in love with her and pursues her affections; but she instead has feelings for Fabian, a stuntman-turned-actor. An unknown assailant begins stalking, kidnapping, and raping the novela's actresses.

Cast

References

External links
 

Erotic television series
2000s Peruvian television series
2001 Peruvian television series debuts
2002 Peruvian television series endings
Spanish-language telenovelas
2001 telenovelas
Peruvian telenovelas
Venevisión telenovelas